James Bissue (born 16 June 1991 in Sekondi-Takoradi) is a Ghanaian footballer who plays as an attacking midfielder for Ococias Kyoto.

Career 
Bissue began his career with Young Wages F.C. before  transferring to Eleven Wise in 2006. On 4 January 2009 he went on a 2-week trial with  Blackburn Rovers F.C. of the English Premier League. He moved to Hapoel Be'er Sheva F.C. in December 2009, from Eleven Wise of the Ghanaian Premiership. Bissue scored 13 goals in 16 matches for Eleven Wise during the 2013-2014 Division 1 season.

On September 18, 2014, Bissue signed a 3-year contract with the Montreal Impact of Major League Soccer. He was training with Ghanaian champions Asante Kotoko but left to sign with the Canadian club.  He was released at the end of the season without making a first-team appearance. One Ghanaian source indicated that complications with paperwork prevented the player from appearing for the club. After being released by Montreal, Bissue returned to his native Ghana but failed to secure a contract with a top-flight club. In December 2015, Bissue had been training with Ghana Premier League club Sekondi Hasaacas for three weeks while in discussion over a contract. The club saw him as a potential replacement for Theophilus Nyame who left the club for Asante Kotoko.

Despite training with Hasaacas, it was announced that Bissue had signed a 2-year contract with the Pittsburgh Riverhounds of the United Soccer League for the 2016 USL season. The move was officially announced on 11 February 2016.

International career
Bissue made five appearances for the Ghana U20 team at the 2011 African Youth Championship in South Africa.  Bissue was also part of the Under-17 team.

References

External links

1991 births
Living people
Ghanaian footballers
Association football forwards
Sekondi Wise Fighters players
Hapoel Be'er Sheva F.C. players
Maccabi Umm al-Fahm F.C. players
Accra Hearts of Oak S.C. players
CF Montréal players
Pittsburgh Riverhounds SC players
SM Sanga Balende players
Israeli Premier League players
Liga Leumit players
USL Championship players
Expatriate footballers in Israel
Ghanaian expatriate sportspeople in Israel
Expatriate soccer players in the United States
Ghanaian expatriate sportspeople in the United States
Expatriate footballers in the Democratic Republic of the Congo
Ghanaian expatriate sportspeople in the Democratic Republic of the Congo
Elmina Sharks F.C. players